Domenico Lucchetti (12 October 1623 – February 1707) was a Roman Catholic prelate who served as Bishop of Marsico Nuovo (1686–1707).

Lucchetti was born in Aliano, Italy on 12 October 1623 and ordained a priest on 21 September 1646.
On 1 April 1686, he was appointed Bishop of Marsico Nuovo by Pope Innocent XI.
He served as Bishop of Marsico Nuovo until his death in Feb 1707.

References

External links and additional sources
 (for Chronology of Bishops) (for Chronology of Bishops) 
 (for Chronology of Bishops) 

17th-century Italian Roman Catholic bishops
18th-century Italian Roman Catholic bishops
Bishops appointed by Pope Innocent XI
1686 births
1707 deaths